Dave Cameron Rosin (born July 28, 1981) is a Canadian guitarist and singer. Rosin was the lead guitarist of the rock band Hedley.

Career
Dave Cameron Rosin was part of a band named Day Theory in 2003. Rosin, Tommy Mac and Chris Crippin were in a band together named Everything After before they met Jacob Hoggard in 2004 and decided to consociate and reform Hedley.

Throughout his time in the band he has worked on 7 albums with them. In 2018, the band took an indefinite hiatus due to sexual assault allegations made against frontman of the band Jacob Hoggard.

Labels
Before signing with Capitol Records and Universal Music Canada, Rosin had record deals from various record labels, which included Island Records and Universal Music Group.

Discography
Hedley
 Hedley (2005)
 Try This at Home (2006) [DVD]
 Famous Last Words (2007)
 The Show Must Go (2009)
 iTunes Sessions (2010) [EP]
 Go with the Show (2010)
 Storms (2011)
 Wild Life (2013)
 Hello (2015)
 Cageless (2017)

References

External links
 Official Hedley website
 Official Day Theory website

1981 births
Living people
Musicians from British Columbia
Canadian rock guitarists
Canadian male guitarists
People from Prince George, British Columbia
Canadian punk rock guitarists
21st-century Canadian guitarists
21st-century Canadian male musicians